Henry Stram (born September 10, 1954) is an American actor and singer. He is the son of famous NFL coach Hank Stram.

Early life
Stram grew up in Kansas City, while his father was the coach of the Kansas City Chiefs. He performed with The Barn Players until he moved to New York City in 1973 and studied acting at the Juilliard School. While at Juilliard, he frequented Cafe La Fortuna, a cafe that opened in 1976 and was known for its garden, opera music and Italian desserts.

In 2012, he participated in Shinsai, which was a benefit concert to support the victims of the Fukushima Daiichi nuclear disaster along with Patti LuPone, Richard Thomas, Mary Beth Hurt, Jay O. Sanders, Jennifer Lim and Angela Lin. The same year, he was in the cast of Rebecca, but the show was closed after it was discovered one of the investors never existed with a following criminal investigation. Ben Sprecher, a producer, hopes it will have a run in 2013.

Personal life
Stram has been with actor Martin Moran since they met while rehearsing The Making of Americans together in 1985. They since have done many shows together. Moran said of their meeting in a 2006 interview, "I remember what a surprise, what a thrill it was, when the coolest actor in the group the one who'd worked with Richard Foreman and at the Guthrie and graduated from Juilliard! started walking me to my subway stop after rehearsals. That was February 1985, twenty-one Valentine Days ago. Since then, we've made a life together through the vagaries of this nutty, blessed business".

Stage credits

Broadway
 Titanic (1997) – as 3rd Class Passenger/Frank Carlson/George Widener
 The Crucible (2002) – as Ezekiel Cheever
 Inherit the Wind (2007) – as Mr. Goodfellow

Off-Broadway
 Mother Courage and Her Children/King Lear (1978, in repertoire) – The American Place Theatre, as Soldier and stretcher bearer
 The Cradle Will Rock (1983) – American Place Theatre/Douglas Fairbanks Theatre, as Dick/Junior Mister
 The Making of Americans (1985) – Music-Theatre Group, 
 1951 (1986) – Perry Street Theatre, as Ray/Bertolt Brecht/Elia Kazan
 Black Seas Follies (1987) – Playwrights Horizons, as Misha
 Prison-Made Tuxedos (1987) – Music-Theatre Group, as Henry
 Cinderella/Cendrillon (1988) – Music-Theatre Group, as Pandolfe
 La Vie Parisienne (1988) – Opera at the Academy, as The Anarchist
 A Bright Room Called Day (1991) – Joseph Papp Public Theater/LuEsther Hall, as Gregory Bazwald
 On the Open Road (1993) – Joseph Papp Public Theater/Martinson Hall, as Monk
 All's Well That Ends Well (1993) – Delacorte Theater, as Lafeau
 Christina Alberta's Father (1994) – Vineyard Theatre, as Albert Edward Preemby
 Jack's Holiday (1995) – Playwrights Horizons, as Snatchem Leese
 Troilus and Cressida (1995) – Delacorte Theater, as Priam/Menelaus/Servant
 The Grey Zone (1996) – MCC Theater, as Josef Mengele
 Henry V (1996) – Delacorte Theater
 Timon of Athens (1996) – Delacorte Theater, as Flavius
 Dancing on Her Knees (1996) – The Public Theatre/LuEshter Hall, as Matthias
 The Winter's Tale (2000) – Delacorte Theater, as Camillo
 Waste (2000) – American Place Theatre, as Sir Gilbert Wedgecroft
 Unwrap Your Candy (2001) – Vineyard Theatre
 The Persians (2003) – Michael Schimmel Center for the Arts, as Counsellor
 See What I Wanna See (2005) – The Public Theatre/Anspacher Theater, as The Janitor/Priest
 Rags and Bones (2007) – Rattlestick Theatre, as The Poet
 The Heart Is a Lonely Hunter (2009) – New York Theatre Workshop, as John Singer
 The Illusion (2011) – Peter Norton Space, as The Amanuensis
 Septimus and Clarissa (2011) – Baruch Performing Arts Center
 Charles Ives Take Me Home (2013) – Rattlestick Theatre, as Charles Ives
Fly By Night (2014) - Playwrights Horizons, as The Narrator
 The School for Scandal (2016) – Lucille Lortel Theatre, as Sir Oliver Surface

Off-off Broadway
 Eddie Goes to Poetry City (Part 2) (1991) – La MaMa
 The Mind King (1992) –  St. Mark's Theatre/Ontological-Hysteric Theater
 My Head Was a Sledge Hammer (1994) – St. Mark's Theatre/Ontological-Hysteric Theater

Regional
 Cyrano de Bergerac (1980) –  Long Wharf Theatre
 The Lion in Winter (1981) – Long Wharf Theatre
 Major Barbara (1987) – Baltimore's Center Stage, as Cusins
 The Cherry Orchard (1988) – Arena Stage, as Trofimov
 Offshore Signals (1988) – The Repertory Theatre of St. Louis, as Schmuel
 Julius Caesar (1989) – Trinity Repertory Company
 On The Town (1989) – Trinity Repertory Company, as Ozzie
 Summerfolk (1989) – Trinity Repertory Company, 
 Shout and Twist (1990) – Odyssey Theatre (Los Angeles), as Hamlet
 Wonderful Tennessee (1994) – McCarter Theatre, as Frank
 The Importance of Being Earnest—McCarter Theatre, as Jack Worthing
 The Mandrake Root (2001) – Long Wharf Theatre, as Robert Randall 
 Lipstick Traces (2002) – Macgowan Little Theater, as Malcolm McLaren
 What Embarrassments (2003) – Wilma Theater, as Henry James
 Singing Forest (2005) –  Long Wharf Theatre, Dr. Shar Unger
 The Birthday Party (2006) – McCarter Theatre, as Stanley
 Rocket to the Moon (2006) – Long Wharf Theatre, as Frenchy
 Spring Awakening (2008) – Original National Tour, Adult Man

Filmography

Film
 Strong Medicine (1981)
 Vamping (1984) – Deacon
 Regarding Henry (1991) – Waiter
 The Real McCoy (1993) – Cashier
 Angela (1995) – Man at Fair
 Jeffrey (1995) – Cousin Gary
 Sleepers (1996) – Prison Doctor
 Calendar the Siamese (1997, Short)
 Illuminata (1998) – Captain
 Cradle Will Rock (1999) – Maxine Elliot's – Hiram Sherman
 Requiem for a Dream (2000) – ECT Technician
 The Caveman's Valentine (2001) – Social Worker
 The Grey Zone (2001) – SS-Hauptsturmführer Josef Mengele
 Cold Souls (2009) – Telegin
 She's Lost Control (2014) – Marty Falk
 Angelica (2015) – Dr. Willette
 Irrational Man (2015) – Cocktail Party Guest
 Submission (2017) – Dave Sterret
 The Greatest Showman (2017) – Ticket Taker
 Ben Is Back (2018) – Mr. Richman

Television
 New York News (1995) – "Welcome Back Cotter" as Assistant Coroner
 Central Park West (1995) – "The History of Gil and Rachel" as Communique Staff
 Law & Order (1997) – "Working Mom" as Kaplan
 Law & Order (2000) – "Standoff" as Daniel Kiley
 NYPD Blue (2000) – "The Man with Two Right Shoes" as Martin
 Kingpin (2003) – "French Connection" (TV series)
 Star Trek: Enterprise (2003) – "The Breach" as Hudak
 Law & Order (2004) – "Hands Free" as Eli Madison
 Law & Order: Criminal Intent (2004) – "Eosphoros" as Wayne Callaway
 Conviction (2006) – "Breakup"
 Boardwalk Empire (2010) – "Belle Femme" as D.W. Fletcher
 White Collar (2012) – "Pulling Strings" as Maurie
 The Americans (2013) – "The Clock" as Man in Group
 Smash (2013) –  "The Movie Star", "Publicity", "The Dress Rehearsal", and "Opening Night"as Justin/Marilyn's Improv Teacher

Controversy
Stram came under fire in 2009 while performing in the Rebecca Gilman stage adaption of The Heart Is a Lonely Hunter by Carson McCullers. Stram was playing a deaf character, and since he is not in real life, it was said of him, "A hearing actor playing a deaf character is tantamount to putting a white actor in blackface" by a member of the board of the Alliance for Inclusion in the Arts. The National Association of the Deaf, Deaf West Theater, and others demanded that the director, Doug Hughes, and the New York Theatre Workshop replace Stram with an actual deaf actor. Stram had played the role in 2005 in the premiere of the show in Atlanta.

References

External links
 
 
 

1954 births
Living people
American male stage actors
People from Lafayette, Indiana
Male actors from Indiana
Juilliard School alumni
Male actors from Kansas City, Missouri
20th-century American male actors
21st-century American male actors